Repo is a surname. People with the surname include:

 Eino S. Repo (1919–2002), president of Yleisradio
 Heikki Repo (1871–1931), Finnish politician
 Juhani Repo (born 1948), Finnish cross country skier
 Liisa Repo-Martell, Canadian actress and artist
 Matti Repo (born 1959), Finnish prelate 
 Mauri Repo (1945–2002), Finnish athletics coach
 Mitro Repo (born 1958), Finnish priest
 Pentti Repo (1930–1997), Finnish athlete
 Sami Repo (born 1971), Finnish cross country skier
 Satu Repo, Canadian writer and academic
 Sebastian Repo (born 1996), Finnish ice hockey player
 Seppo Repo (born 1947), Finnish ice hockey player

See also
 Repo (disambiguation)

Surnames of Finnish origin